Thomas S. R. "Tom" Davis (born c. 1894) was a rugby union player who represented Australia.

Davis, a prop, was born in Sydney and claimed a total of 20 international rugby caps for Australia.

References

                   

Australian rugby union players
Australia international rugby union players
Rugby union players from Sydney
Rugby union props